Qila (translation: Fort) is a 1998 Bollywood Hindi language mystery drama thriller directed by Umesh Mehra and starring Dilip Kumar (in a dual role), Rekha, Mukul Dev, Mamta Kulkarni, Smita Jaykar and Gulshan Grover.

After a film career that began in 1944 and spanned over five decades, this marked the final film appearance of veteran actor Dilip Kumar before his death on 7 July 2021.

The film is a mystery thriller in which Kumar plays dual roles as an evil landowner who is murdered and as his twin brother who is a court judge tasked with investigating who killed him.

Plot
A cruel and evil landowner Jagannath Singh is murdered and his twin brother Amarnath Singh decides to investigate. He finds the list of suspects is endless. The prime suspects are Jagannath's son Amar, Jagannath's abused wife Suman and a woman named Yamini who claims she was raped by Jagannath. Eventually, Jagannath's son Amar confesses to killing his father. He reveals that on the night of his father's death he accidentally shot him while trying to fight him off when Jagannath held Amar and his mother at gunpoint. Soon after the list of suspects grow after it is discovered that Jagannath's had many more enemies who could have killed him including landowner Mangal Singh and even Jagannath's own brother Amarnath who doesn't seem to have got on well with Jagannath himself in the past. Yamini killed Jagannath for his wrongdoings to her brother.

Cast
Dilip Kumar as Jagannath Singh/Judge Amarnath Singh (Dual Role)
Rekha as Yamini
Mukul Dev as Amar J. Singh
Mamta Kulkarni as Neeta
Smita Jaykar as Suman J. Singh
Gulshan Grover as Mangal Singh
Pramod Moutho as Prosecuting Attorney
Rajeshwari Sachdev as Laajo
Malay Chakrabarty as Kundan
Avtar Gill as Inspector Khan
Satish Kaushik as Ghanya Seth
Shahbaz Khan as Inspector Rana
Kunika as Neelam Daniel
Master Sahil Chheda as Child Artist Raja

Music
All songs are composed by Anand Raj Anand with lyrics by Dev Kohli.

References

External links
 
 Review of Qila
 Review on Screen

1990s Hindi-language films
Films scored by Anand Raj Anand
Twins in Indian films